The American Conference - South Division was a division of the Arena Football League's American Conference. 

The Southern Division was formed in 1992 when the AFL first split into three divisions. The League used only conferences in 1993 and 1994, but returned to division play in 1995. The Southern Division has produced 10 ArenaBowl teams and 5 champions, with the most recent during the 2011 Arena Football League season by the Sharks. Rivalries such as the Tampa Bay Storm and Orlando Predators, known as the "War on I-4," used to define this division, but the Georgia Force had risen to the top and dominated in recent years before their folding.

Division lineups
1992
Charlotte Rage
New Orleans Night
Orlando Predators
Tampa Bay Storm
Creation of the Southern Division. Charlotte Rage enfranchised. In 1993, New Orleans Night folded upon suspension of the Southern Division while the league has been realigned into the American/National conference structure.

1995
Miami Hooters
Orlando Predators
Tampa Bay Storm
The Southern Division returns, now part of the National Conference. Three of the National Conference teams, Miami, Orlando, and Tampa Bay reformed this division.

1996
Florida Bobcats
Orlando Predators
Tampa Bay Storm
Texas Terror
Miami Hooters renamed Florida Bobcats. Texas Terror enfranchised.

1997
Florida Bobcats
Orlando Predators
Tampa Bay Storm
Texas Terror moved to the American Conference's Central Division.

1998–1999
Florida Bobcats
Nashville Kats
Orlando Predators
Tampa Bay Storm
Nashville moved in from the National Conference's Eastern Division.

2000
Carolina Cobras
Florida Bobcats
Nashville Kats
Orlando Predators
Tampa Bay Storm
Carolina Cobras enfranchised.

2001
Florida Bobcats
Nashville Kats
Orlando Predators
Tampa Bay Storm
Carolina moved to Eastern Division.

2002–2003
Carolina Cobras
Georgia Force
Orlando Predators
Tampa Bay Storm
Carolina moved back from Eastern Division. Florida Bobcats folded. Nashville moved to Atlanta as Georgia Force.

2004–2005
Austin Wranglers
Georgia Force
New Orleans VooDoo
Orlando Predators
Tampa Bay Storm
Austin Wranglers and New Orleans VooDoo enfranchised. Carolina moved back to Eastern Division.

2006
Austin Wranglers
Georgia Force
Kansas City Brigade
Orlando Predators
Tampa Bay Storm
Kansas City Brigade enfranchised. New Orleans VooDoo suspended due to Hurricane Katrina.

2007
Austin Wranglers
Georgia Force
New Orleans VooDoo
Orlando Predators
Tampa Bay Storm
Kansas City moved to Central Division. New Orleans reactivated.

2008
Georgia Force
New Orleans VooDoo
Orlando Predators
Tampa Bay Storm
Austin Wranglers moved to af2. In 2009, the AFL has been put on a one-year hiatus while Georgia Force and New Orleans are suspended.

2010
Alabama Vipers
Jacksonville Sharks
Orlando Predators
Tampa Bay Storm
The Southern Division moved to the American Conference. Alabama moved in from af2. Jacksonville Sharks enfranchised.

2011–2012
Georgia Force
Jacksonville Sharks
New Orleans VooDoo
Orlando Predators
Tampa Bay Storm
Alabama moved to Duluth as Georgia Force. New Orleans reactivated.

2013–2014
Jacksonville Sharks
New Orleans VooDoo
Orlando Predators
Tampa Bay Storm
Georgia Force folded.

2015
Jacksonville Sharks
Orlando Predators
Tampa Bay Storm
New Orleans VooDoo moved to East Division.

Divisions were discontinued after the 2015 season.

Division Champions  
1992: Orlando Predators (9–1)
1995: Tampa Bay Storm (10–2)
1996: Tampa Bay Storm (12–2)
1997: Orlando Predators (10–4)
1998: Tampa Bay Storm (12–2)
1999: Tampa Bay Storm (11–3)
2000: Orlando Predators (11–3)
2001: Nashville Kats (10–4)
2002: Orlando Predators (7–7)
2003: Tampa Bay Storm (12–4)
2004: New Orleans VooDoo (11–5)
2005: Georgia Force (11–5)
2006: Orlando Predators (10–6)
2007: Georgia Force (13–3)
2008: Georgia Force (10–6)
2010: Jacksonville Sharks (12–4)
2011: Jacksonville Sharks (14–4)
2012: Jacksonville Sharks (10–8)
2013: Jacksonville Sharks (12–6)
2014: Orlando Predators (11–7)
2015: Orlando Predators (12–6)

Arena Football League divisions
Jacksonville Sharks
Orlando Predators
New Orleans VooDoo
Tampa Bay Storm
1995 establishments in the United States
Charlotte Rage
New Orleans Night
Florida Bobcats
Houston Thunderbears
Nashville Kats
Carolina Cobras
Austin Wranglers
Georgia Force
Alabama Vipers
Kansas City Command